Naga Kanya is a 2007 Sri Lankan Sinhala horror romantic film directed by A.A. Junaideen and produced by P. Arooran for A. N. J. Films. It stars Sanath Gunathilake and Dilhani Ekanayake in lead roles along with Arjuna Kamalanath and Sriyantha Mendis. Music co-composed by Somapala Rathnayake and Asokaa Peiris. It is the 1062nd Sri Lankan film in the Sinhala cinema.

Plot

Cast
 Sanath Gunathilake as Saman
 Dilhani Ekanayake as Madhu
 Arjuna Kamalanath as Jagath
 Sriyantha Mendis
 Rex Kodippili
 Norbert Rathnasiri
 M.K. Sudakar
 K. Janaki
 Harinath

References

2006 films
2000s Sinhala-language films